Christopher Scott Kannberg (born August 30, 1966), known professionally as Scott Kannberg and Spiral Stairs, is an American musician best known for being a founding member of the indie-rock band Pavement serving as guitarist and occasional lead vocalist. He also headed the band Preston School of Industry, and has been a solo artist.

Career
Kannberg was a childhood friend of Stephen Malkmus, both of them growing up in Stockton, California. Together they would form the band Pavement under the pseudonyms "Spiral Stairs" and "SM", respectively. Kannberg wrote and sang lead vocals on several Pavement songs, including "Painted Soldiers", "Hit the Plane Down", "Kennel District", "Date With IKEA", and "Passat Dream".

In 1999, he founded Amazing Grease Records with Mike Drake of Oranger. After Pavement disbanded he formed a new band called Preston School of Industry on Matador Records. The band released an EP and two albums, but became inactive in 2004. He released his first solo album in 2009.

Discography

With Pavement

With Preston School of Industry

EPs 
 Goodbye to the Edge City (EP) (2001)

Studio albums 
 All This Sounds Gas (2001)
 Monsoon (2004)

Solo (as 'Spiral Stairs')
 The Real Feel (2009)
 Doris & the Daggers (2017)
 We Wanna Be Hyp-No-Tized (2019)
 Medley Attack!!! (2022)

References

External links
Official Website
Spiral Stairs at MatadorRecords.com

1966 births
Living people
American rock singers
American male singers
American rock guitarists
American male guitarists
Musicians from Stockton, California
Songwriters from California
American indie rock musicians
Pavement (band) members
Guitarists from California
20th-century American guitarists
20th-century American male musicians
American male songwriters